John O'Leary (1 September 1894 – 21 June 1959) was an Irish Labour Party politician who served in the Oireachtas for nearly twenty years, first as Teachta Dála (TD) for Wexford and then as a Senator.

He was elected to Dáil Éireann as a Labour Party TD for the Wexford constituency at the 1943 general election. He was re-elected at the 1944 and 1948 general elections as a National Labour Party TD. At the 1951 and 1954 general elections, he was once again elected as a Labour Party TD.

O'Leary was defeated at the 1957 general election, but was elected to the 9th Seanad by the Administrative Panel. He died in office in 1959, and John J. Brennan of Fianna Fáil was elected at a by-election to replace him.

References

1894 births
1959 deaths
Labour Party (Ireland) TDs
National Labour Party (Ireland) TDs
Labour Party (Ireland) senators
Members of the 11th Dáil
Members of the 12th Dáil
Members of the 13th Dáil
Members of the 14th Dáil
Members of the 15th Dáil
Members of the 9th Seanad